TGA may refer to:
 The IATA Airport Code for Tengah Air Base, Singapore
 Tandy Graphics Adapter for the Tandy 1000 computer system
 Tasman Global Access, a submarine cable linking Australia and New Zealand
 Tennessee Governor's Academy for Math and Science, United States
 Therapeutic Goods Administration, Australian regulatory body
 Thermogravimetric analysis, materials testing procedure
 Thioglycolic acid, organic compound
 Transient global amnesia, a medical condition
 Transposition of the great arteries, a congenital heart defect
 Truevision TGA or TARGA, graphics file format
 Tonga (IOC country code)
 TGA, one of three stop codons
 The Game Awards, annual awards ceremony for the video game industry
 The Gainsborough Academy, a school